Igor Raykhelson (born 24 April 1961 in Leningrad) is a Russian born American classical and jazz pianist and composer. He studied classical and jazz piano as a teenager at Leningrad Conservatory from 1976 then in 1979 his family moved to New York City where Igor continued his education at New York University under Alexander Edelman. His Jazz Suite and works for viola performed by Yuri Bashmet were well received by Gramophone Magazine in 2007.

Works, editions and recordings
 Igor Raykhelson: Jazz Suite and other works. Little Symphony for Strings in G minor. Reflections for Violin, Viola and Strings. Adagio for Viola and Strings. Jazz Suite for Viola, Saxophone and Orchestra. Elena Revich, violin, Igor Butman, saxophone. Igor Raykhelson, piano. Yuri Golubev, double-bass. Eduard Zizak, drums. Moscow-Soloists, ensemble. Yuri Bashmet, viola, conductor. 
 Igor Raykhelson: Violin Concerto in C minor. Viola Concerto in A minor. Yuri Bashmet, viola, Nikolay Sachenko, violin. Novaya Rossiya Orchestra, orchestra Claudio Vandelli, conductor Alexander Sladkovsky, conductor

References

American jazz composers
Russian composers
Russian male composers
American jazz pianists
American male pianists
1961 births
Living people
20th-century American pianists
21st-century American pianists
American male jazz composers
20th-century American male musicians
21st-century American male musicians